Li Yong-chol (born 20 February 1967) is a North Korean sports shooter. He competed in the men's 10 metre running target event at the 1992 Summer Olympics.

References

1967 births
Living people
North Korean male sport shooters
Olympic shooters of North Korea
Shooters at the 1992 Summer Olympics
Place of birth missing (living people)